Tanychastis is a genus of moths of the family Oecophoridae.

Species
Tanychastis lysigama  Meyrick, 1910
Tanychastis moreauella  Guillermet, 2011

References
 Meyrick, E. 1910a. Descriptions of Micro-Lepidoptera from Mauritius and Chagos Isles. - Transactions of the entomological Society of London 1910 (3):366–377

Oecophoridae